RapidBus is an express bus network with bus rapid transit elements in Metro Vancouver, British Columbia, Canada.

History 

On November 23, 2016, the Mayors' Council and TransLink's board of directors approved the first phase of the 10-Year Vision, which included provisions for new B-Line routes (later rebranded as RapidBus) which began service in January 2020. In July 2019, TransLink announced that all future B-Line routes would officially be launched under new "RapidBus" branding and that the 95 and 96 B-Lines would also transition to that branding, leaving route 99 as the only remaining B-Line. The first wave of routes using the RapidBus brandingconsisting of the R1 King George Blvd (the former 96 B-Line), the new R3 Lougheed Hwy, the new R4 41st Ave (replacing the 43 express service along 41st Avenue), and the R5 Hastings St (the former 95 B-Line)launched on January 6, 2020. The R2 Marine Dr launched on April 6, 2020, after construction delays, replacing the former 239.

Features 

 All-door boarding
 Shelters and benches at stops
 Tactile pads
 Real-time information
 Information panels at stops
 On-board route diagrams
 Transit priority measures on streets to improve travel times
 Custom exterior bus livery

RapidBus routes

Phase 1

Future phases

Bus rapid transit lines 
TransLink intends to implement bus rapid transit (BRT) lines in the coming decade. There are 9 BRT routes being planned but the line from Metrotown to Park Royal is the only one listed for immediate planning.

Cancelled RapidBus routes 
 Fraser Highway

See also
List of bus routes in Metro Vancouver

External links
 TransLink

References

 
TransLink (British Columbia)
Transport in Greater Vancouver
2020 establishments in British Columbia